Frets Listanto Butuan (born 4 June 1996) is an Indonesian professional footballer who plays as a winger for Liga 1 club Persib Bandung.

Early career 
Frets liked football since elementary school, He joined the Adidas Halbar Soccer School to develop himself.
Frets came out of Ternate in 2015 while attending the Indonesian National Armed Forces education in Ambon until 2016. After that he first got his service in Kostrad Jakarta. Since entering the army he began the adventure as a migrant.

After that alone pulled PS TNI and joined 2016 Torabika Soccer Championship (TSC). Incidentally the headquarters of PS TNI in Bogor so not far from location serve. But in 2017 when drawn to PSMS Medan to play in Liga 2 until now, because in PSMS many players from PS TNI and also the army.

Career statistics

Club

Honours

Club 
PSMS Medan
 Liga 2 runner-up: 2017
 Indonesia President's Cup 4th place: 2018
Individual
FWP Award 2019: Goal Of The Year
Persib Bandung Favorite Player of the Year 2021–22

References

External links 
 
 Frets Butuan at Liga Indonesia

1996 births
Living people
Indonesian footballers
People from Ternate
Sportspeople from North Maluku
PS TIRA players
PSMS Medan players
Persib Bandung players
Liga 1 (Indonesia) players
Liga 2 (Indonesia) players
Association football wingers